Allan Craig Douglas (born 11 May 1987) is a Bermudian cricketer. He played in the 2014 ICC World Cricket League Division Three tournament.

In August 2019, he was named in Bermuda's squad for the Regional Finals of the 2018–19 ICC T20 World Cup Americas Qualifier tournament. He made his Twenty20 International (T20I) debut for Bermuda against the United States on 18 August 2019. In the final match of the Regional Finals, against the Cayman Islands, Douglas became the first bowler for Bermuda to take a five-wicket haul in a T20I match.

In September 2019, he was named in Bermuda's squad for the 2019 ICC T20 World Cup Qualifier tournament in the United Arab Emirates. In October 2021, he was named in Bermuda's squad for the 2021 ICC Men's T20 World Cup Americas Qualifier tournament in Antigua.

References

External links
 

1987 births
Living people
Bermudian cricketers
Bermuda Twenty20 International cricketers
Place of birth missing (living people)